Briony Behets (born 1951, London, United Kingdom) is an English-Australian actress who found fame acting in Australian soap operas of the 1970s and 1980s

Early life
Behets' father worked as a civil engineer, which took him around the world and as a result much of Behets' childhood was spent in Germany, Africa and Sierra Leone before returning to England. At age 17 she was accepted into the Guildhall School of Music and Drama in London, studying there for two years. After completing the course she travelled to the United States as part of a student exchange project, working there as a nightclub dancer.

Career
At age 19, she travelled to Australia to take a regular role in comedy series Birds in the Bush (1972), and decided to stay in the country when production ceased on the series after 13 episodes.

Behets subsequently enjoyed several high-profile television roles in Australia. She was an original cast member of soap opera Number 96 playing Helen Eastwood in 1972 but her character was written out of the serial after only a few months. She was subsequently a member of the original cast of another adult soap The Box starting in 1974 and her role in that series lasted 14 months. After leaving The Box she appeared for a short stint in Bellbird before taking an ongoing role in the school-based teen soap Class of '75.

Behets was also a longtime weather presenter on ATV-10 Melbourne's news bulletins during the mid-1970s. She also acted in television guest starring roles in Australian drama series, including Homicide, Matlock Police, Bluey,  Cop Shop, The Young Doctors and Chopper Squad, also in the 1970s. In 1979 in the women's prison soap opera Prisoner she portrayed Susan Rice, the unbalanced wife of a popular celebrity.

Film roles included the joint lead with Judy Morris in The Trespassers (1976) for which she was nominated for a Best Actress Award, Raw Deal (1977), Inside Looking Out (1977), Long Weekend (1978).

Later TV guest roles included A Country Practice and The Flying Doctors in the 1980s. Later soap roles included appearances in Possession as the mother of a spoiled child actor; Neighbours as Amanda Harris the mother of regular character Jane Harris; and in E Street as Margaret Bennett, popular character Lisa Bennett's mother, for 6 months, in 1989. She acted in the feature film Cassandra in 1986.

Starting in 1990, she was a regular lead in the Granada Television soap Families. Into the 2000s, she continued acting in Australian television series and miniseries.

In 1996, Behets guest starred on the American television series Murder, She Wrote, Season 12, Episode 20, titled "Southern Double-Cross".

In the 2000s she also guest starred in some US drama series such as JAG. She returned to Neighbours in July 2008, in another role as Kate Newton a romantic interest for Harold Bishop (Ian Smith). She had also starred alongside Ian Smith in Neighbours 21 years earlier in 1987 when she played a different character.  Her latest role saw her as a regular on The Saddle Club series three as the second actor to portray Mrs. Reg.

Selected filmography

Television

Stage/theatre
 Don's Party (1975)
 Private Lives (1976)
 It's Ralph (1992)

References

External links

1951 births
Actresses from London
Australian film actresses
Australian soap opera actresses
English film actresses
English soap opera actresses
English television actresses
Living people
Alumni of the Guildhall School of Music and Drama
English emigrants to Australia
20th-century Australian actresses
20th-century English actresses
21st-century Australian actresses
21st-century English actresses